Hemmatabad (also Romanized as Hemmatābād; also known as Himmatābād and Khimmatabad) is a village in Eqbal-e Gharbi Rural District, in the Central District of Qazvin County, Qazvin Province, Iran. At the 2006 census, its population was 632, in 135 families.

References 

Populated places in Qazvin County